Fran is a graphic novel by American cartoonist Jim Woodring released in 2013.  The wordless book is the third Frank graphic novel, following Weathercraft (2010) and Congress of the Animals (2011).  After the anthropomorphic Frank violently loses his self-control with his secretive female counterpart Fran, whom he discovered at the end of Congress of the Animals, she leaves him, and he sets out in search of her.

References

Works cited

 
 
 

2013 graphic novels
Fantagraphics titles
Books by Jim Woodring
Comics by Jim Woodring